Victoria Ravva (born October 31, 1975) is a  Georgian-born volleyball player who represented both Azerbaijan and France in international volleyball. She spent the most of her career in RC Cannes.

Ravva was born in Tbilisi. She started her career in BZBK Baku (1989–1993) and Ankara Vakifbank (1994–1995). She is married to Georgian volleyball player Alexandre Jioshvili. In the 2010 season  she was the best blocker of Women's CEV Champions League.

Clubs
  BZBK Baku (1989–1993)
  Vakifbank (1993–1995)
  RC Cannes (1995–2015)

Titles
 Women's CEV Champions League (2): 2002, 2003.
 French Women's Volleyball League (19): 1996, 1998, 1999, 2000, 2001, 2002, 2003, 2004, 2005, 2006, 2007, 2008, 2009, 2010, 2011, 2012, 2013, 2014, 2015
 French Cup (18): 1996, 1997, 1998, 1999, 2000, 2001, 2003, 2004, 2005, 2006, 2007, 2008, 2009, 2010, 2011, 2012, 2013, 2014
 Turkish Cup (1): 1995

Individual awards
 1998-99 French League "Most Valuable Player"
 2001-02 French League "Most Valuable Player"
 2001-02 French League "Best Blocker"
 2001–02 CEV Champions League "Most Valuable Player"
 2001–02 CEV Champions League "Best Score"
 2001–02 CEV Champions League "Best Blocker"
 2002–03 CEV Champions League "Best Blocker"
 2002–03 CEV Champions League "Most Valuable Player"
 2005–06 CEV Champions League "Most Valuable Player"
 2005–06 CEV Champions League "Best Blocker"
 2005–06 CEV Champions League "Best Score"
 2008-09 French League "Best Blocker"
 2009-10 French League "Most Valuable Player"
 2009-10 French League "Best Blocker"
 2010-11 French League "Best Blocker"
 2011-12 French League "Best Blocker"

References

External links
 
 RC Cannes Profile

1975 births
Living people
Sportspeople from Tbilisi
French women's volleyball players
Azerbaijani women's volleyball players
Georgian emigrants to Azerbaijan
Georgian emigrants to France
Naturalized citizens of Azerbaijan
Naturalized citizens of France
French people of Georgian descent
Middle blockers
Expatriate volleyball players in Turkey
Azerbaijani expatriate sportspeople in Turkey